Hawne is a residential area approximately one mile from Halesowen town centre in the county of West Midlands, England. It includes Newfield Park Primary School, Earls High School and Halesowen College. There is a mix of private and council housing in the area, much built between 1950 and 1980, but with many terraced houses from circa 1890. Another landmark in the area is The Grove, home of non-league football team Halesowen Town.
It is also home to the owners of Betts Motor Services in Netherton.

References

Areas of Dudley
Halesowen